The fifth season of Cold Case, an American television series, began airing on September 23, 2007 and concluded on May 4, 2008. Season five regular cast members include Kathryn Morris, Danny Pino, John Finn, Thom Barry, Jeremy Ratchford and Tracie Thoms. This season was originally scheduled to air 24 episodes, but due to the Writer's Strike only 18 episodes were produced and aired.

Cast

Episodes

References

2007 American television seasons
2008 American television seasons
Cold Case seasons
Television about the internment of Japanese Americans